Florencia Carlotto (born ) is a retired Argentine female volleyball player, playing as a c. She was part of the Argentina women's national volleyball team.

She participated in the 2011 Women's Pan American Volleyball championship.
On club level she played for CA Banco Nación in 2011.
She participated in the 2013 FIVB Volleyball World Grand Prix.

References

External links
http://www.scoresway.com/?sport=volleyball&page=player&id=1962

1988 births
Living people
Argentine women's volleyball players
Place of birth missing (living people)
Middle blockers